In Denmark, a parish (Danish: sogn, plural sogne) is a local ecclesiastical unit in the Church of Denmark. Each parish is assigned to a physical church, and the church's administration (sognekontor) handles the area's civic registration of births, marriages and deaths. Each Danish municipality is composed of one or more parishes.

From the middle of the 19th century until the 1970 administrative reform, parishes not located in a Danish market town (købstad) also operated as the lowest level of civil administration, either individually or in groups of two or three parishes known as parish municipalities (sognekommuner). In the civil context, the parish was headed by a parish council (sogneråd), the chairman of which was called a parish chairman (sognerådsformand, literally meaning a parish council chairman).

History

Danish parishes originated in the Middle Ages. Beginning in 1645, Danish pastors have been required to maintain a parish register (kirkebog), which in modern times has become a valuable tool for genealogical research. Since 1812, each parish has been instructed to keep two separate copies of this record, one written by the priest and one by a dean (degn), stored in separate buildings to prevent the destruction of both in case of fire. In 2001, civil registrations were merged into a national computerized system (elektronisk kirkebog), now handled by around 500 parish priests.

Until the municipal reform of 1970, parish municipalities functioned as the lowest unit of civil government with responsibility mostly concerning schools, roads, unemployment and care for the invalids and the elderly without family. In 1870, there were 1097 parish municipalities. Figures before and after 1920 cannot be compared directly due to the 1920 reunification of South Jutland with Denmark.

In the 1970 municipal reform, Denmark's 88 market towns and more than 1300 parish municipalities merged to become 277 municipalities. Since 1970, municipalities normally comprise several parishes. The number of municipalities was further reduced by the 2007 municipal reform to 98.

The parish boundaries continue to play a significant role in terms of community cohesion - notably in rural areas - and are often a basis for school districts.

Civil and church administrations 
Between 1662 and the Danish municipal reform of 1970, each parish was assigned to a hundred (herred) which in turn was part of a county (amt). In 1970, the hundreds lost their administrative functions and the counties were dissolved at the end of 2006. Since 2007, each municipality comprises one or more parishes, and in turn belongs to a region.

Each parish is assigned to a deanery (provsti), in turn forming part of a diocese (stift). Some parishes are administered collectively as a pastorat, with usually one or two priests providing religions services in the area.

The civic registration of births, marriages and deaths is conducted by the Church of Denmark. Historically, a number of religious minorities have been awarded the same right concerning their own members, notable the Jewish and Calvinist communities in Denmark. An exception to the historical system of parish-level registers is South Jutland where registers are kept by the local municipalities (Haderslev, Sønderborg, Tønder, and Aabenraa Municipalities). This administrative divergence dates from the 1864-1920 period when the South Jutland region was part of Prussia.

See also 
Danish municipal reforms of 1970 and of 2007
Other administrative units (current or historical) in Denmark, roughly in decreasing order of size:
Regions of Denmark
Counties of Denmark
Hundreds of Denmark
Municipalities of Denmark
Market town#Denmark
Socken, the equivalent unit in Sweden

References

External links 
 FamilySearch page on Danish parishes